Silanus may refer to:

 Silanus, Sardinia, a town in Sardinia
 Silanus of Ambracia (fl. 5th century BC), Greek soothsayer
 Gaius Julius Silanus, Roman senator
 Junius Silanus (disambiguation), Romans

See also